The Anastasia Formation is a geologic formation deposited in Florida during the Late Pleistocene epoch.

Age
Period : Quaternary
Epoch: Pleistocene ~2.558 to 0.012 mya, calculates to a period of 
Faunal stage: Blancan through early Rancholabrean

Location
Anastasia Formation overlies the Atlantic Coastal Ridge along the coast from St. John's County southward to Palm Beach County and extends inland as far as 20 miles (32 kilometers) in St. Lucie and Martin County. Blowing Rocks Preserve in southern Martin County is an exposed outcropping along the beach.  A second outcropping is seen at Washington Oaks Gardens State Park in northern Flagler County, south of St. Augustine.

History
The Anastasia Formation was named by E. H. Sellards in 1912.

Coquina obtained from this formation on Anastasia Island was used to construct Castillo de San Marcos during the late 17th century; a local material, it was relatively easy to quarry and proved to be effective for absorbing cannon damage. This formation is an integral part of the surficial aquifer system.

Formed through multicyclic deposition the formation contains at least two disconformities, and two detectable ages. The formation registers in the late Pleistocene with oldest samples aging at 110,000 YBP based on radiometric dating (U234/Th230).

Composition 

The Anastasia Formation is composed of quartz sands and calcite coquina, with sporadic instances of fossil debris. Coloration of the formation varies from a light grey tone to a soft orange-brown. The formation is soft to moderately hard coquina composed of whole and fragmented mollusk shells within sand often cemented by sparry calcite. Sands occur as fossil-bearing light gray to tan as well as orange-brown, unconsolidated to moderately indurated. 

Fossils consist of both vertebral and invertebral species most of which are still present in the current epoch. Poriferans, bryozoans, mollusks, arthropods, and echinoderms have all been seen and recorded within the formation. Vertebrate taxa include cetacean, testudines, perissodactyla, and selachimorpha. Most fossils are highly fragmented with greatest preservation seen in the Blowing Rocks Preserve in Martin County, and regions north of Palm Beach. Bioturbation is also seen in Palm Beach, Martin and Flagler counties. Large and small fossilized burrows formed by invertebrate species are seen in Palm Beach and Martin Counties whereas Flagler County sees large borings formed and fossilized around trees previously present in the area.

The Formation is seen as a relevant portion of the Biscayne Aquifer. It is also an integral part of the surficial aquifer system in northern portions of Florida.

References

Geologic formations of Florida
Quaternary geologic formations
Limestone formations
Shallow marine deposits
Paleontology in Florida